Udaya TV is a regional Kannada entertainment television channel from Sun TV Network. It is also the first Kannada general entertainment channel in India. This is a list of the programmes broadcast by Udaya TV.

Current broadcasts

Original serials

Reality shows

Dubbed serials

Former broadcasts
Original series

Dubbed series

Reality shows

References

Uday
Uday